Drumline: A New Beat is a 2014 American television film directed by Bille Woodruff. It is the sequel to 2002's Drumline. The screenplay, a fictional story about a historically black college marching band, was written by Karen Gist and Regina Hicks. The story is about a young drummer from New York, played by Alexandra Shipp, who enters the fictional Atlanta A&T University and bumps heads with the leader of her new school's drum section. Jordan Calloway, Mario Van Peebles, and LeToya Luckett co-star. Leonard Roberts reprises his role as Sean Taylor, while Nick Cannon reprise his role as Devon Miles. Cannon also serves as the film's executive producer.

The film premiered on VH1 on October 21, 2014 and released to DVD on March 3, 2015.

Plot

Twelve years after the events of the first film, Danielle "Dani" Raymond (Alexandra Shipp), an upper class Brooklyn girl, defies her parents in order to attend a college in Atlanta so she can join and revitalize their once-prominent drum line. Dani's quest to become the first female section leader of the drum line in the school's history will be hampered by upperclassmen (including her cousin Tyree, her feelings for bandmate and rival, Jayven (Jordan Calloway), and the school's crosstown rivals.

The rising action begins with character establishment and a meeting of the love interests on campus. Then the band grind and “training montage” begins. Leading up to the climactic final event, things go wrong and the characters have to band together to pull off the successful performance.

Cast
 Alexandra Shipp as Danielle "Dani" Raymond
 Leonard Roberts as Sean Taylor
 Jordan Calloway as Jayven LaPierre
 Jeff Pierre as Tyree
 Mario Van Peebles as Dr. Chalmus Raymond
 DeRay Davis as Kevin Taylor
 Jasmine Burke as Tasha Williams
 Rome Flynn as Leon
 Tye White as Armondi Mason
 Scott Shilstone as Josh
 Lisa Arrindell Anderson as Lois Raymond
 LeToya Luckett as Dr. Nia Phillips
 Nick Cannon as Devon Miles

Production
Filming began in May 2014 in Atlanta, Georgia.

References

External links
 
 
 

Television sequel films
Films about percussion and percussionists
Films directed by Bille Woodruff
Films shot in Atlanta
2014 LGBT-related films
American television films
American LGBT-related films
VH1 films
2014 television films
2014 films
Films set in New York (state)
Sports and historically black universities and colleges in the United States
2010s English-language films
2010s American films